Lykling (historically: Løkling) is a village in Bømlo municipality in Vestland county, Norway. The village is located on the southwestern part of the island of Bømlo.

Lykling has become a popular tourist attraction, mainly due to its history of extensive gold mining in Lyklingeberga, the mountainous area surrounding the village. The discovery of gold in 1862 by a young shepherd, led to several constructions being built in the area. These were built by three major companies, mainly financed and run by English businessmen.

In addition to the mining constructions, two hotels, one hotel ship, several bakeries, Lykling Church, and a number of retail stores were built in the village. At its peak, about 500 men were working in these mines.

References

Villages in Vestland
Bømlo